Chester E. "Chipper" Harris Jr. (August 30, 1962 – May 26, 2018) was an American basketball player, best known for his college career at Robert Morris University in Pennsylvania, where he was the ECAC Metro Conference co-Player of the Year for the 1983–84 season.

Harris came to Robert Morris (RMU) in 1980 after a high school career at Valley High School in his native New Kensington, Pennsylvania. He led the school to the 1979 Pennsylvania state championship. At Robert Morris, Harris teamed with backcourt mate Forest Grant to lead the Colonials from a 3–17 record in their freshman years to back-to back NCAA tournament appearances the next two seasons. Harris, a defensive standout, unofficially led the nation in steals in his junior and senior seasons (the NCAA began officially recording the statistic two years later). Harris was the Most Valuable Player of the 1984 ECAC Metro tournament (now the Northeast Conference) and in his senior season was named first-team all-conference and co-player of the year with Robert Jackson of St. Francis and Carey Scurry of Long Island. He left RMU as the school's all-time leader in points and steals (although his scoring mark was eclipsed ten years later). He an inaugural member of the Robert Morris Ring of Honor.

Following the close of his college career, Harris was drafted by the Kansas City Kings in the seventh round (148th pick) of the 1984 NBA draft, but did not play in the National Basketball Association. He played a season for the New Jersey Jammers in the United States Basketball League (USBL), and spent some time playing overseas.

Harris died on May 26, 2018 of complications from Diabetes at the age of 55.

References

1962 births
2018 deaths
20th-century African-American sportspeople
African-American basketball players
American men's basketball players
Basketball players from Pennsylvania
Deaths from diabetes
Kansas City Kings draft picks
People from New Kensington, Pennsylvania
Point guards
Robert Morris Colonials men's basketball players
Shooting guards
Sportspeople from the Pittsburgh metropolitan area